Dead Astronauts is a 2019 Science fiction novel by Jeff VanderMeer. It is a sequel to Borne but features different characters and a new narrative. It was nominated for the Locus Awards Best Fantasy Novel of 2020.

Plot 
The first half of the novel follow three part human shapeshifters - Grayson, Moss, and Chen - as they travel through worlds to fight "The Company". Grayson, the leader, is a former astronaut that can see iterations of the future and information about others through a blinded eye. After exploring space and finding no habitable planets and no signs of life, she returns to "The City" and finds it transformed by the company. She flees the city and travels west where she encounters and falls in love with Moss. Moss is a sentient moss that takes the form of a person around her companions, but can shapeshift with ease and split into multiple selves. Together Moss and Grayson decide to return to The City and attempt to save it from "The Company". On the way they run into Chen, a creation of The Company who became disillusioned and horrified at the work he was doing and fled. Chen sees the world in equations and formulas, but is always on the verge of collapsing into a mass of salamanders. The three then set out across multiple timelines and versions of the world to try and stop the company.

The second half of the novel follows a homeless woman, Sarah, as she seeks to understand the journal of Charlie X, a scientist of "The Company".

Reception 
Dead Astronauts was met with mixed reviews. Many reviewers found the story to be elusive and unclear and the novel to be overstuffed with too loosely linked concepts and character. The same reviewers though found that the loose connections added to the message and themes of the novel. 

While there was much criticism a cult following has emerged seeing this novel as a innovative visionary work of climate fiction, as Nina Allen writes, "the author deliberately deconstructs the very concept of familiarity and forces us up against his subject matter in a way that demands we not only engage with it, but recognize its vast importance to our lives and futures.".

References 

American science fiction novels
English-language novels
2019 science fiction novels
Farrar, Straus and Giroux books